Lena Anderson is a Swedish children's book illustrator and author.

Anderson was born in Stockholm, Sweden in 1939. She first gained international success for her illustrations in the 1985 picture book Linnea in Monet's Garden, which was translated into English in 1987. The book, which she made with Christina Björk, took five years to finish. She has worked on multiple other books with writer Christina Björk, including a series of children's stories with the character Linnea. Anderson's nature-based drawings continue the tradition of Swedish picture book styles, similar to that of Elsa Beskow's work.

Selected works

Illustrator
 Linnea Planterar ("Linnea's Windowsill Garden") (1978; English trans., 1988), by Christina Björk
 Linnea in Monet's Garden (1985; English trans., 1987)
 Linnea's Almanac (1985; English trans., 1989), by Christina Björk

Author and illustrator
 Majas alfabet ("Maja's Alphabet") (1984)
 Stina (1988; English trans., 1989)
 Bunny Party (1989)
 Stina's Visit (1989; English trans., 1991)
 ABC, sa lilla t ("ABC, Said Little T") (1994)
 Tea for Ten (1998; English trans., 2000)
 Tick-Tock (1998)

Awards
In 1988, Anderson won the Astrid Lindgren Prize along with Christina Björk. Also in 1988, Linnea in Monet's Garden received the Deutscher Jugendliteraturpreis (German Children's Literature Award) in the children's book category.

References

External links
Examples of Lena Anderson's illustrations from Cultivating Home

Living people
Artists from Stockholm
Swedish women children's writers
Swedish children's writers
20th-century Swedish artists
Swedish children's book illustrators
Swedish women illustrators
20th-century Swedish women writers
21st-century Swedish artists
21st-century Swedish women writers
1939 births
Writers from Stockholm